The Episcopal School of Dallas (ESD) is an independent, co-educational preparatory day school located in Dallas, Texas.

History
The Episcopal School of Dallas is a coeducational academic community founded in 1974 by Stephen B. Swann and a group of Episcopalian local leaders. The first ESD class was held in 1974 and included eight 7th graders. Today, approximately 1,150 students attend ESD, aged Beginner (age 3) through 12th grade, with 435 students in the Upper School (9th – 12th grade). David L. Baad is the Head of School.

Campus
The campus contains four major buildings, with a total of 308,000 sq ft (28,600 m²) in facilities. The school's first building, the gymnasium, was built in the late 1970s. Until the main building was in 1981, classes were held in the gym. In 1986, the school had another major expansion, which added a library, publication suite, and fine arts facilities, along with additional classrooms and offices.

The Cook Math and Science Building was completed in 1994 to allow the construction of additional science labs, computer labs, and math classrooms. Daily chapel was moved from the gym to the All Saints Chapel following its completion in 2002. In 2005, another project, the Susan M. Frank Center for Arts and Humanities Building opened, allowing for the construction of additional humanities classrooms, as well as expanded music facilities. In addition, the school also offers a Proscenium and a black box theater, a ceramics studio, a sculpture studio, a student art gallery and a digital imaging suite and darkroom. Additional improvements include a 55,000 sq ft (5,100 m²) humanities building added to the Merrell Road campus, a new stadium and new turf field, and improved locker room facilities. The new stadium also features improved accommodations for fans. The school also acquired an outdoor education center in northern Collin County, spanning spans 165 acres (0.67 km²).

In 2010, the school opened its Stephen B. Swann Athletic and Wellness Center. The building houses Dining Commons, physical education facilities, and additional office space. The building, covering over 100,00 sq.ft., also includes two gymnasiums, indoor track, conditioning and workout facilities, a dance studio, a wrestling room, and sports medicine facilities. The building was later modified to expand locker rooms and add a team room and athletic offices. The new dining facilities can seat 480 students, and overlook the school's quarry and Louise Crespi Benners Courtyard. The kitchen also houses a laboratory for instruction from nutritional experts and professional chefs, based on guidelines from the Center for Human Nutrition at The University of Texas Southwest Medical Center. There's also a greenhouse and chicken coop outside by the quarry.

With the opening of a new lower-school facility in 2020, ESD became a unified community once more. Planning for the new building began in 2015 and the structure was completed in 2020. The multi-story facility contains over 60,000 sq ft of space. In September 2020, the structure won the "Best Project in K-12 Education by Engineering News-Record" award, beating out other structures in Mississippi, Arkansas, Louisiana, Oklahoma, and Texas.

Demographics 
ESD has an enrollment of more than 1,100 students and more than 200 faculty and staff members. They have a student-faculty ratio of 7:1. The student population contains a plurality of Episcopalian (30%) and majority Caucasian students (82%). The school also provides tuition assistance to students through grants.  There are 33 AP courses offered and 71 different zip codes represented in the student body.

Controversy
In 2012, the school was found guilty of fraud and negligent behavior for mishandling a 2009 statutory rape. A 34-year-old teacher sexually assaulted a 16-year-old student, using a school-owned vehicle, and a school credit card to rent a hotel room. The teacher pleaded guilty in criminal court. Administrators forced the victim to withdraw upon hearing about their relations. The student's parents pressed civil charges against ESD and were awarded $9 million for punitive and compensatory damages from the withdrawal.

Notable alumni

Barrett Brown - Journalist, essayist, involved with Anonymous
Gray Malin - Photographer
Drew Moor - Professional soccer player for the Colorado Rapids
Phil Pressey - Professional basketball player for the Boston Celtics

References

External links
 
 

Educational institutions established in 1974
1974 establishments in Texas
Private K-12 schools in Dallas
Independent Schools Association of the Southwest
Episcopal schools in the United States